Antonio Carlos Liberalli Bellotto (born June 30, 1960) is a Brazilian musician and writer, best known as the lead guitarist of Brazilian rock band Titãs. He has also written and released several books.

Childhood 
Bellotto spent his childhood in the city of Assis, São Paulo. He decided to be a rock guitarist when he was a child. After hearing Jimi Hendrix albums, he composed his first songs on the guitar, while he explored other notable guitarists, like Keith Richards, Jimmy Page and Eric Clapton.

He also had a passion for books. He explored writers like Rubem Fonseca, Jorge Amado, Ernest Hemingway, Herman Melville and his famous Moby-Dick.

When he was 14 years old, he was given his first guitar. Although very interested in Jovem Guarda and Yellow Submarine from The Beatles, Bellotto only entered deeply in the rock music one year later, on a trip to the United States. When he returned to Brazil, he started living in the city of Assis, São Paulo. In his baggage, he brought albums from Muddy Waters and Robert Johnson. These influences, together with Caetano Veloso, João Gilberto and Luiz Melodia, some of his idols, contributed for his wide knowledge of music.

Career 

With his guitar, he toured colleges and bars singing and playing, with his own compositions, and opening shows of well known MPB names, like Jorge Mautner. With the help of Carlos Barmack, he got to know Branco Mello and Marcelo Fromer. The three formed the group Trio Mamão. At that time, Bellotto attempted to enter an architecture course at a college in Santos, but he quit it to dedicate his life only to music and writing. In 1982, little before the first performances with Titãs do Iê-Iê, his first daughter, Nina, was born to him and his wife Ana Paula Silveira.

And as for the books, in 1994, during one of the breaks of the band, Bellotto wrote and released for the publishing company Cia. Das Letras his book Bellini e a Esfinge (Bellini and the Sphinx), the story of a detective who lives in the suburbs of São Paulo. Two years later, Bellini reappeared in the second book, Bellini e o Demônio (Bellini and the Devil). In 2001, he released two more books: "BR 163 – Duas História na Estrada" (BR 163 – Two Stories on The Road) and "O Livro do Guitarrista" (The Book of The Guitarist), with clues, discographies and curiosities of the history of the rock. In 2002, the first adventure of Bellini was adapted for the movies, starring Fábio Assunção as the main character. In 2008, the second book was also adapted with Assunção reprising his role. On the television, he began to appear in 1999, on the TV Futura, on the program Afinando a Língua (Tuning the language), an informal electronic class of Portuguese language. In August 2014, he released the fourth book of his Bellini series: Bellini e o Labirinto (Bellini and the labyrinth).

Until 2012, Tony Bellotto kept a column called "Cenas Urbanas" ("Urban Scenes") at Brazilian magazine Veja. Since June 2013, he has been writing for the newspaper O Globo every Sunday.

Personal life 
In 1985, Tony and his then bandmate Arnaldo Antunes were arrested for possession of heroin. During a police operation to prevent taxi drivers from being robbed, officers stopped the taxi in which Bellotto was and found 30mg of the drug with him. Later, they went to Antunes's apartment, where they found 128mg. Antunes was charged with drug trafficking while Bellotto was charged with possession only. He paid  his bail (Cr$ 400,000) and awaited for trial out of jail. Bellotto is now a supporter of drug liberalization. He is an atheist.

In September 2011 he lost his father, one day prior to the opening of Rock in Rio 2011, in which he performed with Titãs.

By the end of the 1980s, he was in a relationship with actress Giulia Gam. Married since 1990 to the actress Malu Mader, Bellotto had with her two more sons, João (born in 1995) and Antônio (born in 1997). All of them live in Rio de Janeiro.

Discography

With Titãs

Guest appearances

Bibliography as a writer 
 Bellini e a Esfinge (1995), Companhia das Letras
 Bellini e o Demônio (1997), Companhia das Letras
 BR 163 - Duas Histórias na Estrada (2001), Companhia das Letras
 O Livro do Guitarrista (2001), Companhia das Letras
 Bellini e os Espíritos (2005), Companhia das Letras
 Os Insones (2007), Companhia das Letras
 Bellini e o Labirinto (2014), Companhia das Letras

References 

 Bellotto's page at Titãs official web site

External links 
 

1960 births
Living people
Brazilian male guitarists
Brazilian songwriters
Brazilian composers
Brazilian rock guitarists
Lead guitarists
Slide guitarists
Brazilian people of Italian descent
Titãs members
20th-century Brazilian novelists
20th-century Brazilian male writers
Brazilian male novelists
Brazilian columnists
Brazilian atheists
Musicians from São Paulo
Drug policy reform activists
21st-century Brazilian novelists
21st-century Brazilian male writers
People from Assis